Local Nature Reserves (LNRs) are designated by local authorities under the National Parks and Access to the Countryside Act 1949. The local authority must have a legal control over the site, by owning or leasing it or having an agreement with the owner. LNRs are sites which have a special local interest either biologically or geologically, and local authorities have a duty to care for them. They can apply local byelaws to manage and protect LNRs.

East Sussex is a county in South East England. It is bordered by Kent to the north-east, West Sussex to the west, Surrey to the north and the English Channel to the south.

As of July 2019, there are 26 LNRs in East Sussex. Ten sites are Sites of Special Scientific Interest, three are Special Protection Areas, three are Special Areas of Conservation, one is a Ramsar site, two are Scheduled Monuments, two are Geological Conservation Review sites, one is a Nature Conservation Review site and six are managed by the Sussex Wildlife Trust.

Key

Other classifications

GCR = Geological Conservation Review site
NCR = Nature Conservation Review site
Ramsar = Ramsar site, an internationally important wetland site
SAC = Special Area of Conservation

SM = Scheduled monument
SPA = Special Protection Area under the European Union Directive on the Conservation of Wild Birds
 SSSI = Site of Special Scientific Interest
SWT = Sussex Wildlife Trust

Sites

See also
List of Sites of Special Scientific Interest in East Sussex
Sussex Wildlife Trust

Notes

References

Sources

 
East Sussex
East Sussex-related lists